The Ujjayanta Palace also known as Nuyungma, is the former royal palace of Tripura kingdom built by Maharaja Radha Kishore Manikya in 1901; and the name was given by Rabindranath Tagore. It housed the State Legislative Assembly up to 2011. At present, it is the State Museum of Tripura, which is located in the capital Agartala.

The palace was constructed between 1899 and 1901 by Maharaja Radha Kishore Manikya Debbarma and stands on the banks of two lakes surrounded by gardens inspired by the European style. It was the home of the ruling Manikya dynasty until Tripura's merger into India in October 1949. The palace was purchased from the royal family by the Government of Tripura in 1972–73 for Rs. 2.5 million, and used to house the State Legislative Assembly until July 2011. Ujjayanta Palace is now a State Museum and it primarily showcases the lifestyle, arts, culture, tradition and utility crafts of communities residing in northeast India, along with a lot of stone sculptures, coinage of the Manikya dynasty and some other artifacts.

History 
Tripura claims to be one of the oldest princely states of ancient India. The royal line of Tripura began during the reign of Maharaja Maha Manikya, who was crowned in 1400 AD, and was the first ruler under the royal title of Manikya. It was devastated by the Assam earthquake of 12 June 1897. The palace was rebuilt in the heart of Agartala city by Maharaja Radha Kishore Manikya in 1899–1901, at a then exorbitant cost of 10 lakh (1 million) rupees. It was built by Martin and Burn Co.

As state assembly building
Upon the merger of the Kingdom of Tripura with India in 1949, royal properties were nationalised. The main building along with the area around the palace was purchased from the royal family by the Tripura government in 1972–73.

As state museum
The museum was given seismic retrofitting to prevent possible earthquake damage, and the museum was inaugurated by the vice-president of India Mohammad Hamid Ansari on 25 September 2013.

Early in the museum's history, controversy erupted over the state government's proposed move to change the name of Ujjayanta Palace to Tripura State Museum. The Indigenous Nationalist Party of Twipra (INPT) has written to vice-president, Hamid Ansari, protesting that the name of the museum should reflect the history and heritage of the region. Pradyut Bikram Kishore Debbarma, the titular king of Tripura said, "The palace is a historical spot. It doesn’t belong to the members of the erstwhile royal family alone, neither does it solely belongs to the government. It belongs to Tripura and somebody in the government can’t suddenly impose a decision to change its name". The government decided to keep the original name of Ujjayanta Palace and to build a statue of Maharaj Radha Kishore Manikya on the museum premises.

Design 
The buildings and grounds cover  in the heart of Agartala. The neoclassical palace was designed by Sir Alexander Martin of the Martin and Burn Company. The architecture shows a mix of influences: Mughal, Roman and British There are two large artificial ponds on either side of the garden which is decorated with pools and fountains.

Several Hindu temples occupy plots adjacent to Ujjayanta Palace, dedicated to Lakshmi Narayan, Uma-Maheshwari, Durga and Jagannath.

Gallery

See also 

 Tripura State Tribal Museum

References

External links 
 Video of Ujjayanta Palace

Buildings and structures in Agartala
Palaces in Tripura
Royal residences in India
Buildings and structures completed in 1901
Neoclassical palaces
Tripura Legislative Assembly
Legislative buildings in India
Museums in Tripura
20th-century architecture in India